Tyropanoic acid and its salt sodium tyropanoate are radiocontrast agents used in cholecystography (X-ray diagnosis of gallstones).  Trade names include Bilopaque, Lumopaque, Tyropaque, and Bilopac.  This molecule contains three heavy iodine atoms which obstruct X-rays in the same way as the calcium in bones to produce a visible image.  After injection it is rapidly excreted into the bile.

References

Iodoarenes
Carboxylic acids
Butyramides
Anilides